Colegio San Jose, Barranquilla,, is a private Catholic primary and secondary school, located in the San Jose section of Barranquilla, Atlántico, Colombia. The co-educational school was founded by the Society of Jesus in 1918 and currently covers kindergarten through baccalaureate.

See also

 Education in Colombia
 List of schools in Colombia
 List of Jesuit schools

References  

Jesuit secondary schools in Colombia
Jesuit primary schools in Colombia
Educational institutions established in 1918
1918 establishments in Colombia
Schools in Barranquilla